Langate is a Notified Area and Tehsil in Kupwara District of Jammu and Kashmir India.it is located 16 km towards South from District Headquarters Kupwara and 70 km from State Capital Srinagar.

The landmark at langate chowk is public park langate.

Langate is the tehsil headquarter of Langate town. It is located 20 km towards south from district headquarters Kupwara. 66 km from State capital Srinagar, Jammu towards East.

Langate Tehsil is bounded by Kralgund Tehsils towards South, Handwara Tehsil towards North. Sopore City, Baramula City, Watergam City, Srinagar City are the nearby Cities to Langate.

Education Fest 2022 
As part of development activities taking place in and around all of Kashmir, an Education Fest was organised for the students of North Kashmir in Langate wherein over 19 colleges from all across India took part to guide and counsel the students to make correct life choices. Not only this, but scholarships were also offered to students who possessed the caliber to soar high in the sky and make a difference in the future. Scholarships worth almost Rs. 1.2 Cr was given to various students which also included the needy students.

See also
Unisoo, Langate

References

External links
 http://kupwara.nic.in

Cities and towns in Kupwara district